Point Lonsdale is a coastal township on the Bellarine Peninsula, near Queenscliff, Victoria, Australia. The town is divided between the Borough of Queenscliffe and the City of Greater Geelong. Point Lonsdale is also one of the headlands which, with Point Nepean, frame The Rip, the entrance to Port Phillip. The headland is dominated by the Point Lonsdale Lighthouse. The population grows rapidly over the summer months through to the Easter period due to its popularity as a holiday destination.

History
The traditional owners of this area are the Wautharong people of the Kulin nation. The escaped convict William Buckley, the first known European to have lived in the area, lived with local Aborigines from 1803 to 1835. A signal station was built in 1854. Permanent European settlement began at Point Lonsdale in the latter half of the 19th century with the construction of a lighthouse in 1863 and the extension of the railway line from Geelong to Queenscliff in 1879. Since settlement, many ships have been wrecked on the rocky reefs at the entrance to Port Phillip.

The post office opened on 15 January 1902.

The town is named after police officer William Lonsdale and is the birthplace of former Premier of Victoria Thomas Hollway.

Heritage listed sites

Point Lonsdale contains several Victorian Heritage Register listed sites, including:

 7 Glaneuse Road, Arilpa
 57–73 Glaneuse Road, Ballara
 2 Point Lonsdale Road, Point Lonsdale Lighthouse

Environment
Next to the town is Lake Victoria, a shallow saline lake that is part of the Lonsdale Lakes Nature Reserve and an important site for the waterbirds and migratory waders that form part of the population using the Ramsar-listed Swan Bay wetland system.

The coastal rock platforms and adjacent waters are included in the Port Phillip Heads Marine National Park. The intertidal platforms have the highest invertebrate diversity of any calcarenite reef in Victoria, while subtidal areas are characterised by diverse and abundant algal communities as well as by encrusting organisms such as ascidians, sponges and bryozoans.

Along the open coast there are regular sightings of threatened marine mammals such as humpback and southern right whales.

Other 

Point Lonsdale has a large 100-year-old Norfolk Pine 'The Christmas Tree' that is lit up on the first Saturday in December at the end of an evening of A Community Celebration of Christmas. The Community Celebration of Christmas is run by a committee of volunteers assisted by the local service clubs, Lions and Rotary. The focus of the event is the community and children and each year the lights are turned on by a special guest (or guests) of honour chosen for their contribution to the Community. The Borough of Queenscliffe has a high percentage of volunteers and it is usually volunteers that are chosen as the special guest/guests of honour in recognition of their contribution to the community. Santa arrives at 7:25pm in the local Fire Brigade Truck, whilst throwing lollies to the children, to start an evening of entertainment by local performers. Glowcandles are sold as a fundraiser for maintaining equipment on the tree with all profits supporting the ongoing lighting of the tree. The tree itself is decorated by community volunteers and service club members coordinated by The Christmas Tree Committee. Festooning is hauled up by hand and manually secured into the tree. This tree can be found at the corner of Grimes Road and Point Lonsdale Rd, Point Lonsdale, Victoria. When lit up this tree can be seen for miles out to sea and is a Queenscliffe Borough icon, having been lit since about 1952–1953. When the lights are on you know Christmas is getting close.

The township of Point Lonsdale has also been used in some episodes of the hit children's series Round the Twist for some of the exterior scenes.

Sport
Golfers play at the course of the Lonsdale Golf Club on Fellows Road, which is currently undergoing a major renovation. 
Bowlers bowl at the Point Lonsdale Bowling Club. 
Surfers surf with the Point Lonsdale Boardriders Club The tennis club is open to members and their guests.

Gallery

References

External links

 Great Ocean Road info

Towns in Victoria (Australia)
Towns in Barwon (region)
Borough of Queenscliffe
City of Greater Geelong
Bellarine Peninsula
Coastal towns in Victoria (Australia)
Suburbs of Geelong
Port Phillip
Lonsdale